Una cavalla tutta nuda (literally The all-naked horse) is a 1972 commedia sexy all'italiana directed by Franco Rossetti.

Plot 
The story is set in the Middle Ages. The youngsters Folcacchio and Guffardo must bring an embassy to the Bishop of Volterra, and during the trip, the two boys meet the beautiful Gemmata. The woman is a poor peasant who is married to Nicholas. Folcacchio and Guffardo, to have a night of love with the girl, pretend to be magicians who can turn humans into beasts. In fact Gemmata wants to be transformed into a horse to plow the land of her property without fatigue. So Folcacchio and Guffardo invent a magic ritual that includes the use of the cock.

Cast 
Don Backy: Folcacchio de' Folcacchieri
Barbara Bouchet: Gemmata
Renzo Montagnani: Gulfardo de' Bardi
Vittorio Congia: Matias
Pietro Torrisi: Torello, the 'Stallion'
Leopoldo Trieste: Nicolò
Edda Ferronao: Moglie dell'oste
Carla Romanelli: Pampinea

References

External links
 

1972 films
1970s Italian-language films
1970s sex comedy films
Commedia sexy all'italiana
Films based on works by Giovanni Boccaccio
Films set in the Middle Ages
1972 comedy films
1970s Italian films